Zama Dlamini is a goalkeeper. He plays for Royal Eagles.

References

External links

Living people
1991 births
Association football goalkeepers
South African soccer players
Mpumalanga Black Aces F.C. players
Thanda Royal Zulu F.C. players
Mamelodi Sundowns F.C. players
Royal Eagles F.C. players
Witbank Spurs F.C. players
Chippa United F.C. players
Highlands Park F.C. players
Baroka F.C. players
Real Kings F.C. players
South African Premier Division players
National First Division players